Statistics of Football League First Division in the 1965–66 season.

Overview
Liverpool won the First Division title for the seventh time in the club's history that season. They made sure of that with a 2–1 win over Chelsea at Anfield on 30 April, and ended the season 6 points clear of Leeds United. Blackburn Rovers were relegated on April 20, after losing 1–0 at home to West Bromwich Albion and Northampton Town's result at White Hart Lane against Tottenham Hotspur (which finished 1–1) going against Blackburn. Northampton Town also went down on 7 May, after Nottingham Forest beat Sheffield Wednesday 1–0 at the City Ground, saving Forest from relegation in the process.

League standings

Results

Top scorers

References

RSSSF

Football League First Division seasons
Eng
1965–66 Football League
1965–66 in English football leagues

lt:Anglijos futbolo varžybos 1965–1966 m.
hu:1965–1966-es angol labdarúgó-bajnokság (első osztály)
ru:Футбольная лига Англии 1965-1966